Deniz Aytekin (born 21 July 1978) is a German football referee. He referees for TSV Altenberg of the Bavarian Football Association. Aytekin is a former FIFA referee, and was ranked as a UEFA elite category referee.

Refereeing career
Aytekin refereed his first Bundesliga match on 27 September 2008 when Hertha BSC played FC Energie Cottbus in Berlin. Energie Cottbus won the game 1–0, and Aytekin gave out four yellow cards, including one to Cottbus goalkeeper Gerhard Tremmel for time-wasting in the 90th minute.

Notably, Aytekin was the referee of the 2016–17 UEFA Champions League round of 16 second leg match between Paris Saint-Germain F.C. and FC Barcelona at the Camp Nou on 8 March 2017. The final score of the match was a famous 6–1 victory for Barcelona, while the Catalan club had lost by 4 goals to 0 in the first leg. The refereeing of this match was criticized by the international press, in particular by some German dailies such as Der Tagesspiegel. After the match, PSG lodged a complaint for ten refereeing errors with UEFA, which, without suspending him, de facto dismissed Deniz Aytekin from the major European posters, entrusting him with only a few minor group matches in the UEFA Champions League the following two seasons.

In April 2017, he was appointed to referee the 2017 DFB-Pokal Final between Borussia Dortmund and Eintracht Frankfurt.

On September 13, 2017, during the first day of the Champions League group stage he officiated the match between NK Maribor and Spartak Moscow (1-1), he narrowly avoided a rocket coming from the stands that house the supporters of the Moscow team.

In October 2017, Aytekin was invited, along with other foreign referees, by the Chinese Federation to referee matches in the Chinese Super League, with the aim of improving the image of a championship shaken by revelations concerning the existence of match-fixing.

On 28 July 2022, Aytekin announced that he had put an end to his international career, and that he would only continue refereeing at a national level in Germany.

Personal life
Aytekin is of Turkish descent. He lives in Oberasbach, Bavaria. In addition to his career as a referee, he is an entrepreneur who co-founded the websites Fitnessmarkt.de and Anwalt.de.

References

External links
 Profile at dfb.de 
 Profile at worldfootball.net

1978 births
Living people
Sportspeople from Nuremberg
German football referees
German people of Turkish descent
UEFA Champions League referees
UEFA Europa League referees